Kyi Kyi Tin-Myint, known by her pen name Kyi Aye was a Burmese poet, novelist, and short story writer. Born in Yangon, she studied at University of Medicine and University of Yangon. She is credited as one of the most influential Burmese writers for several generations, however, her works remain largely unknown outside Burmese language.

Life and career 
Kyi Kyi was born in British Burma's Hledan, Yangon district on 13 December 1929, the third child of U Han and Daw Ngwai Yon. In 1948, the year Burma regained its independence from the British, she began attending Rangoon University. She began as a medical student, but changed course in her third year, finishing school with a bachelor of arts instead. She received her BA from University of Yangon with a major in English literature. In 1953, she married a bank manager Tin Myint. After the marriage, she managed to work as a lecturer in the English Department of Yangon University and resumed her interrupted medical studies to completion.

She had begun writing poems and short stories since she was in high school. Her first short story, titled "That Night" (ထိုည) was published in Taya Magazine, which was founded by Dagon Taya in 1947. Her works were lifelike stories of the upper middle class. Her language was crisp and forceful. Her plots were frank and familiar. She used to write about the feelings of her characters without restraint.

She emigrated to the United States in December 1971, with her husband and children, where she obtained her medical license. She became a psychiatrist, specializing in Child and Adolescent psychiatry. She worked at a number of hospitals and institutions in the US and UK and retired in 2002. She died on 28 December 2016, of acute myeloid leukemia.

Works 
Burmese

|-
! Poetry Collection
|-
|* ကြည်အေး၏ကဗျာများ||||(Collected Poems of Kyi Aye)||1990
|-
|* ပွင့်ဒင်္ဂ ||||(The Moment of Apotheosis)||2016
|-
! Fiction
|-
|* မီ ||Mee||(Ms. Mee)||1955
|-
|* နွမ်းလျအိမ်ပြန်||||(The Tiresome Return)||1958
|-
|* ဖုန်းသက်တိုင်||||(Eternal Love of A Monsieur)||1960
|-
|* တမ်းတတတ်သည်||||(Longing)||1961
|-
|* ကျွန်မပညာသည်||||(I am the Artist)||1961
|-
|* ကေဖွဲ့ဆိုသီ||||(When Ms. Kay Composes)||1963
|-
|* မောင် ကိုကိုနှင့် မြနန္ဒာ||||(Maung, Ko Ko and Myanandar)||1973
|-
|* မေတ္တာမီးအိမ်||||(Lamp of Love)||1980
|-
|* အပြင်ကလူ||||(The Outsider)||1996
|-
|* မှန်၏မှောင်ရိပ် : စိုးနှင့်ခိုင်||||(Through a Glass Darkly : Soe and Khine)||1996
|-
|* မှန်၏မှောင်ရိပ် : အိမ်ဖြူလင်းသစ်||||(Through a Glass Darkly : Bright and White Home)||2001
|-
! Short Stories Collection 
|-
|* ကြည်အေး၏ ဝတ္ထုတိုများ||||(Short Stories of Kyi Aye)||1994
|-
|* ဝတ္ထုတိုပေါင်းချုပ်||||(Collected Short Stories of Kyi Aye)||2007
|-
! Memoirs
|-
|* ဘဝအစွန်မှာ ||||(At the Edge of A Lifetime)||2015
|

English
 "Working Elephants" (Essay), Back to Mandalay: Burmese Life, Past and Present edited by Gillian Cribbs, Abbeville Publishing Group, September 1996.

Burmese Translation
 Jr. LeGrand Cannon, Look to the Mountain, 1955. (တောတောင်ရေမြေ)
 Pearl S. Buck, This Proud Heart, 1994. (ဤမာန)

See also
Burmese literature

References

Burmese novelists
Burmese women short story writers
Burmese psychiatrists
Burmese women physicians
University of Medicine 1, Yangon alumni
University of Yangon alumni
20th-century Burmese poets
21st-century Burmese poets
20th-century Burmese writers
21st-century Burmese writers
20th-century Burmese women writers
21st-century Burmese women writers
20th-century novelists
20th-century short story writers
21st-century novelists
21st-century short story writers
People from Yangon
Burmese women poets
Burmese emigrants to the United States
1929 births
2016 deaths
American psychiatrists
American women psychiatrists
21st-century American women